Sounds Like Love is a 2021 Spanish romantic comedy film directed by  from a screenplay by Laura Sarmiento, based on the 2018 novel duology Canciones y recuerdos by . The film stars María Valverde and Álex González and was released on Netflix on 29 September 2021.

Plot
Maca, a clumsy 30 year-old who lives in Madrid, is stuck as an assistant for an oppressive and terrifying fashion influencer, wasting her talent and spending most of her time with men with whom she never manages to establish an emotional bond. Together with her two unique and loveable friends, Jimena and Adriana, Maca endeavours to make the most of life and happiness, despite her dead-end job, making almost everything possible. All seems to be going well until Maca's ex Leo returns to her life, flipping her almost perfect life upside down. Leo was the biggest mistake of Maca's life, the man who tore her heart apart and obliterated her self-esteem and her faith in men. Maca had forgotten all about him, but now she has to accept that he has suddenly come back into her life and she must face those emotions that she has repressed for so long, dealing with the unforgettable memory of what could have been and never was.

Cast

Production
On 30 January 2020, it was announced that Netflix had greenlighted an adaptation of Elísabet Benavent's two-part book series Songs and Memories during a Spanish original programming conference in Madrid. The film began principal photography on 5 October 2020, when it was announced that Juana Macías was attached to direct the film from a screenplay by Laura Sarmiento. It was also announced that María Valverde and Álex González were cast in lead roles, with Elísabet Casanovas, Susana Abaitúa, Eva Ugarte, and Miri Pérez-Cabrero also set to star in the film alongside Roger Berruezo, Ignacio Montes, Artur Busquets, Claudia Galán, and Carlo Costanzia who were cast in supporting roles. Filming took place throughout Madrid and Lisbon. By May 2021, the film had completed production, with Benavent stating:

Release
The film was released on 29 September 2021 by Netflix.

See also 
 List of Spanish films of 2021

References

External links
 
 

2021 films
2021 LGBT-related films
2021 romantic comedy films
Films about friendship
Films based on Spanish novels
Films set in Madrid
Films shot in Lisbon
Films shot in Madrid
LGBT-related romantic comedy films
Spanish-language Netflix original films
Spanish LGBT-related films
Spanish romantic comedy films
Zeta Studios films
2020s Spanish-language films
2020s Spanish films